K. Ramachandra Babu (15 December 1947 – 21 December 2019) was an Indian cinematographer of over 125 films, out of which most are Malayalam films. He also worked for films in Tamil, Telugu, Hindi, Arabic and English languages. He served as the cinematographer for several documentaries and advertisement films as well. He was the founder of the Indian Society of Cinematographers (ISC).

Early life and career
Ramachandra Babu was born on 15 December 1947 in Maduranthakam at Chengalpattu District, Tamil Nadu, as the eldest son of Malayali parents, Kunjan Pillai and Padmini Amma, both from Alappuzha, Kerala. After obtaining his B.Sc. (Chemistry) degree from Loyola College, Madras in 1966, he went on to join the Film and Television Institute of India, Pune to study cinematography. In the Institute, he made friends with Balu Mahendra, John Abraham and K.G. George, who would go on to become noted film directors. He obtained his Diploma in Cinema (Motion Picture Photography) in 1971.

He made his feature film debut in 1971 as a cinematographer even before completing his FTII course, for Vidyarthikale Ithile Ithile. It was also the debut film of director John Abraham and writer Azad. Ramachandra Babu became noted in the industry after he served as the cinematographer for Nirmalyam (1973) and Swapnadanam (1976), which were directorial debuts of M.T. Vasudevan Nair and K.G. George, respectively. All these films were shot in Black & White.

Later career
Ramachandra Babu's first colour film (Eastman Color) was Dweepu (1977), directed by Ramu Kariat, and it won him his first Kerala State Film Award for Best Cinematography. He went on to win 3 more State Awards for Rathinirvedam (1978) and Chamaram (1980), directed by Bharathan, and Oru Vadakkan Veeragadha (1989), directed by Hariharan.

He played a prominent role in ushering in the technical advancements in cinematography into Malayalam cinema. The transition from Black & White to colour aside, he served as the cinematographer for the first CinemaScope film to be shot in South India, Alavuddinum Athbutha Vilakkum (1979), directed by I. V. Sasi. Despite featuring major stars like Kamal Haasan, Rajinikanth and Jayabharathi, the film was delayed and another CinemaScope film Thacholi Ambu (1978) was released ahead of it, leaving the latter to be considered as the first CinemaScope film in South India. He was the cinematographer of the first film to be released with 70 mm film in Malayalam. The film, Padayottam (1982), directed by Jijo Punnoose, was from the production house of Thacholi Ambu, Navodaya. The film was photographed in CinemaScope format and was converted to 70 mm blow-up prints with 6-track magnetic stereo sound during post-production.

His noted films include Nirmalyam (1973 – National Award For Best Feature Film, directed by M. T. Vasudevan Nair), Swapnadanam (1975 – Kerala State Film Award for Best Film, directed by K. G. George), Bandhanam (1978 – Kerala State Best Film, directed by M. T. Vasudevan Nair), Agraharathil Kazhuthai (1978 – Best Tamil Film – National Award, directed by John Abraham), Sandhyakku Virinja Poovu directed by P.G. Viswambharan,  Itha Ivide Vare directed by I. V. Sasi), Patita (1980 – Hindi, directed by I. V. Sasi), Yavanika (directed by K. G. George) & Marmaram (directed by Bharathan), both Kerala State Best Film Award – 1982, Padayottam (first Malayalam 70 mm feature film, 1982, directed by Jijo), Pagal Nilavu (1985 – Tamil, directed by Mani Rathnam), Oru Vadakkan Veera Gaadha (1989 – Malayalam, directed by Hariharan), Aadhaaram (1992 – Malayalam, directed by George Kithu), Sallapam (1996 – Malayalam, directed by Sunder Das), Ghazal (1993 – Malayalam, directed by Kamal), Kanmadam (1998 – Malayalam, directed by Lohithadas), Beyond the Soul (English – 2003 – directed by Rajiv Anchal) and Al-Boom (Arabic – 2005 – directed by Khaled Abdul Raheem Al-Zadjali).

Awards

Kerala State Film Award for Best Cinematography
1976 – Dweepu
1978 – Rathinirvedam
1980 – Chamaram
1989 – Oru Vadakkan Veeragadha
Cinema Masika Award (1973) : Nirmalyam
Rangam Magazine Award (1977) : Itha Ivide Vare
Kerala Film Critics Award (1981) : Nidhra
Film Fans Association Award (1981) : Yavanika
Nana Film Weekly Award (1982) : Yavanika
Film Arts Club Cochin Award (1989) : Oru Vadakkan Veeragatha
Film Arts Club Cochin Award  (1994) : Ghazal
Johnsons Asianet Film Award (1998) : Kanmadham
SICA Lifetime Achievement Award (2008)
Kala Keralam Award (2008)
Kerala Film Critics Award (2009) : Kadaksham
Vayalar Samskarika Vedi Award (2010) : Yugapurushan

Positions held
The positions held by Ramachandra Babu in various organisations and award committees include:
Chairman – Technical Committee, India International Film Festival 1997
Member – Technical Committee, International Film Festival of Kerala, 1999
Jury – Kerala State Television Awards Committee 1998
Jury – Padmarajan Film Award Committee 1998
Jury – Asianet Film Awards Committee 2002
Jury – John Abraham Film Award Committee 2003
Resource Person –  MACTA Chalachitra Kalari
Jury –  SICA Awards for Malayalam Films 2002
Exec. Committee Member – Kerala Chalachitra Academy 2003
Jury – Aravindan Puraskaram 2004
Jury – Mathrubhoomi Film Awards, 2003
Jury –  SICA Awards for Malayalam Films 2006
Jury – J. C. Daniel Award for outstanding contribution to Malayalam cinema 2009
President – Indian Society of Cinematographers
Vice Chairman –  Malayalam Cine Technicians Association
General Secretary –  Malayalam Cine Technicians Association
President –    MACTA Cinematographers' Union
Vice President – MACTA Federation
President – MACTA Federation

Filmography
The list of films for which Ramachandra Babu served as the director of cinematography:

Unreleased films
Kaadhal Viduthalai (Tamil) – Dir: Jayakumar
Puthiya Swarangal (Tamil) –  Dir: Vijayan
Puthu Mazhathullikal (Malayalam) – Dir: Raghavan
Kavaadam (Malayalam) – Dir: K.R.Joshi
Professor Dingan (director) - Died during the production

Gallery

References

External links

 Official website
 Official website of Indian Society of Cinematographers
 
 The Hindu: Metro Plus: Tiruchirapalli: Cinema goes haiku
 The Hindu: Friday Review Thiruvananthapuram / Cinema: Waxing lyrical on film 
Official Website of Information and Public Relation Department of Kerala

1947 births
2019 deaths
Cinematographers from Kerala
Malayalam film cinematographers
Film and Television Institute of India alumni
People from Kanchipuram district
Loyola College, Chennai alumni
20th-century Indian film directors
Malayalam film directors
21st-century Indian film directors
Film directors from Kerala
20th-century Indian photographers
21st-century Indian photographers
Cinematographers from Tamil Nadu